Antonio Marinari, O. Carm. (10 January 1605 – 20 August 1689) was a Roman Catholic prelate who served as Auxiliary Bishop of Ostia-Velletri (1667–1689) and Titular Bishop of Thagaste (1667–1689).

Biography
Antonio Marinari was born in Grottaglie, Italy on 10 January 1605 and ordained a priest in the Order of Our Lady of Mount Carmel on 8 April 1628.
On 7 February 1667, he was appointed during the papacy of Pope Alexander VII as Auxiliary Bishop of Ostia-Velletri and Titular Bishop of Thagaste.
On 13 February 1667, he was consecrated bishop by Francesco Barberini, Cardinal-Bishop of Ostia e Velletri, with Joseph-Marie de Suarès, Bishop Emeritus of Vaison, and Persio Caracci, Bishop Emeritus of Larino, serving as co-consecrators. 
He served as Auxiliary Bishop of Ostia-Velletri until his death on 20 August 1689.

References 

17th-century Italian Roman Catholic bishops
Bishops appointed by Pope Alexander VII
1605 births
1689 deaths
Carmelite bishops